Johanna Catharina "Joke" de Korte (born 18 August 1935) is a retired Dutch backstroke and freestyle swimmer. She finished fourth in 100m backstroke at the 1952 Summer Olympics, and won two silver medals at the 1954 European Aquatics Championships.

References

1935 births
Living people
Dutch female backstroke swimmers
Dutch female freestyle swimmers
Olympic swimmers of the Netherlands
Swimmers at the 1952 Summer Olympics
Swimmers from Rotterdam
European Aquatics Championships medalists in swimming
20th-century Dutch women